Shash Appan is a Welsh LGBT+ and anti-racist activist. A co-founder of Trans Aid Cymru, she also serves as a director of the Trans Safety Network. She has also advocated for tenant rights, co-founding a website for tenants in Cardiff to anonymously rate their landlords.

Biography 
In 2020, she organised several protests in Cardiff calling for reform of the Gender Recognition Act 2004.

In March 2021, she raised concerns about a hustings held online by the Youth Cymru charity in which Plaid Cymru MS Helen Mary Jones was invited to speak, despites Jones having repeatedly made controversial comments about transgender people. After attempting to raise concerns, she was subsequently kicked out of the hustings after displaying the trans pride flag in her profile picture. The controversy led to the resignations of two of the charity's trustees. In August 2021, she was named to Wales Online's Pinc List of the most influential LGBT+ people in Wales.

In April 2022, she gave a speech at a protest held by Trans Aid Cymru in front of the Tŷ William Morgan - William Morgan House calling for a ban on conversion therapy and talking about her experience as a survivor of conversion therapy. In June 2022, she gave a speech at a PinkNews reception held at the National Museum Cardiff in which she condemned British politicians, some of whom where in attendance, for stoking transphobia within British society, saying in particular that "transphobia is essentially Tory policy."

References

External links 
 

Living people
Transgender rights activists
1996 births